George Memmoli (August 3, 1938 – May 20, 1985) was a founding member of the improv troupe Ace Trucking Company and an actor. He was known for his corpulent presence in his roles, weighing as much as 450 pounds.

He was a friend and frequent collaborator of director Martin Scorsese, appearing in Mean Streets as a pool hall owner (1973) and New York, New York (1977), and contributing to a documentary that focused on a mutual friend of his and Scorsese, American Boy: A Profile of Steven Prince (1978).

Career

In other roles Memmoli played Philbin in Brian De Palma's Phantom of the Paradise (1974) and Jenkins in Scorsese collaborator Paul Schrader's Blue Collar (1978), and he had a small but memorable role in Rocky (1976) as the ice rink worker who, while sporadically counting down, allows Rocky and Adrian their rushed first date alone on the ice after closing. On the set of Blue Collar, co-star Richard Pryor hit Memmoli's head with a chair and fractured his skull. As a result, Memmoli filed a $1 million lawsuit against Pryor.

In 1979 he portrayed the engineer Earl during the first season of the McLean Stevenson sitcom Hello, Larry.

Memmoli's last TV appearance was as Paul "the Wall" Srignoli in the Hill Street Blues episode "The Rise and Fall of Paul the Wall," which aired on December 6, 1984. His final screen appearance was in the 1985 film The Sure Thing, as Uncle Nunzi.

At one point Memmoli reportedly had gotten his weight down to 190 pounds, but a 1975 accident in a stunt car while filming "The Farmer" put him in the hospital for three months, and during the six months convalescence that followed his weight ballooned back to 350 pounds. Scorsese attributed Memmoli's early death to the accident, and cited it as a cautionary tale for young low-budget filmmakers who take too many chances.

Filmography

References

External links

1938 births
1985 deaths
Male actors from New York City
American male film actors
American male television actors
20th-century American male actors